Davidsonia is a genus containing three rainforest tree species native to Australia, that are commonly known as the Davidson or Davidson's plum. The fruits superficially resemble the European plum, but are not closely related. All species have an edible sour fruit with burgundy-coloured flesh and are highly regarded as gourmet bushfood.

Davidsonia jerseyana, Davidson's plum or Mullumbimby plum, is a slender small tree, generally 5 metres high, native to lowland subtropical rainforests of New South Wales. It is considered an endangered species in the wild, but is widely cultivated for its pleasantly sour fruit that is used in jam, wine, ice-cream and sauces.
Davidsonia johnsonii, smooth Davidson's plum, is a small tree with a spreading canopy and smooth leaves, native to New South Wales and southeast Queensland. It is also considered an endangered species in the wild but is not widely cultivated because of its infertile seeds. It is propagated vegetatively from cuttings or root division.
Davidsonia pruriens, Ooray or Queensland Davidson's plum, is a taller tree than the other two species, reaching up to 12 metres high. It is also slender and has larger fruit which are produced in large clusters from the trunk or branches.

Small-scale plantations in New South Wales and Queensland supply the demand, mainly from Davidsonia jerseyana and Davidsonia pruriens.

Gallery

References

 Bruneteau, Jean-Paul, Tukka, Real Australian Food, .
 Cherikoff, Vic, The Bushfood Handbook, .
 Kersh, Jennice and Raymond, Edna's Table, .
 Low, Tim, Wild Food Plants of Australia,

External links
  CSIRO plant profile 
  Ooray name origin

Bushfood
Oxalidales of Australia
Cunoniaceae
Australian cuisine
Oxalidales genera